Mangaltar may refer to:

Mangaltar, Kavrepalanchok, Nepal
Mangaltar, Khotang, Nepal